Kristen Hedley is a speech language pathologist.

Background 
Kristen Hedley was raised in Consort, Alberta. In 2005, Hedley was awarded the 4-H Premier's Award. In 2012, Hedley obtained a Master of Science in Speech Language Pathology at the University of Alberta.

Scholarship 
Kristen Hedley's research is primarily concerned with phonological disorders and the implications such disorders may have in childhood education environments. Much of Hedley's scholarship employs the Alberta Education curriculum as a case study. In 2016, communication scientist Phyllis Schneider explained that

In 2016, Hedley received the Horizon Award from the Alberta College Of Speech-Language Pathologists & Audiologists (ACSLPA).

References

External links 
 University of Alberta webpage

Speech production researchers
Communication scholars
Speech processing researchers
Year of birth missing (living people)
Living people